4th Period Mystery, released internationally as The Clue, is a 2009 South Korean thriller film starring Yoo Seung-ho and Kang So-ra.

It was released on August 12, 2009, and drew a total of 67,602 admissions.

Production

Casting
Originally, actress Kim So-eun was going to play the role of Dajung but she was replaced with Kang sora because of Kim's filming schedules for the TV series He Who Can't Marry .

Filming locations
The film was filmed in Sungsa middle school located in Goyang.

Plot
Jung-hoon (Yoo Seung-ho) is the best student at his school. His rival, Tae-gyu (Jo Sang-geun), takes any and every opportunity to knock him down both verbally and physically, and the two are known enemies amongst the other students. One afternoon Tae-gyu pushes Jung-hoon too far and the latter threatens Tae-gyu with a knife, an act that's witnessed by another student. Jung-hoon walks away from the situation, but shortly after the beginning of 4th period class he returns to find Tae-gyu dead. The boy has been stabbed repeatedly, and still in shock, Jung-hoon picks up the bloody knife off a nearby desk just as Da-jung (Kang So-ra) shows up, catching him in a most incriminating position. Fortunately for him, she not only believes his innocence, but offers to help him to solve the mystery and catch the real killer – a task made particularly urgent by the fact that in 40 minutes the rest of the class will return and the body will be discovered. The pair set out in search of the murderer and soon discover that just about everyone's a suspect and even more unsettling, the murderer is now after them as well.

Cast
Yoo Seung-ho as Han Jung-hoon
Kang So-ra as Lee Da-jung 
 as Kim Tae-gyu 
 as Byung-soo
Jeong Seog-yong　정석용 as Kang Gook-man 
Park Chul-min as Han Kang-man 
Lee Young-jin as Sang-mi
Kim Ji-eun as Student
Kim Dong-beom as Do-il
 as Tak Teu-in
 as Principal
Im Soo-hyang
 Sung Hyuk as a gym teacher
 Kim Young-woong as history teacher

Indian remake
2016 Tamil movie Pencil is a remake of the movie.

References

External links
 

2009 films
2009 action thriller films
2000s mystery thriller films
2000s chase films
South Korean crime thriller films
South Korean mystery thriller films
South Korean teen films
2009 crime thriller films
Lotte Entertainment films
2000s Korean-language films
South Korean chase films
South Korean films remade in other languages
2000s South Korean films